Jozef Pavlík (born 12 July 1973) is a retired Slovak football midfielder. He used to play for Kremser SC. 

He last served as the assistant to Mikuláš Radványi and Jan Kameník at Pohronie.

Honours

Managerial
Chittagong Abahani 
Independence Cup: 2016

References

1973 births
Living people
Slovak footballers
FK Inter Bratislava players
FC Spartak Trnava players
Panserraikos F.C. players
Ethnikos Asteras F.C. players
Kremser SC players
Association football midfielders
Slovak expatriate footballers
Slovak expatriate football managers
Expatriate footballers in Greece
Expatriate football managers in Greece
Slovak expatriate sportspeople in Greece
Expatriate footballers in Austria
Slovak expatriate sportspeople in Austria
Expatriate football managers in Bangladesh
Slovak expatriate sportspeople in Bangladesh
Expatriate football managers in Libya
Slovak expatriate sportspeople in Libya
People from Levice
Sportspeople from the Nitra Region